Gerardo Espinoza Ahumada (born 3 October 1981) is a Mexican former professional footballer and current manager.

Playing career

Club
Gerardo played for Atlante for a year and went back to Santos Laguna, but was transferred to Club Atlas before he got to play for Santos.

Espinoza was transferred to Atlas for the Apertura 2009 season.

International
He was part of the Mexican 2004 Olympic football team, who were eliminated in the first round, having finished third in group A, below group winners Mali and South Korea.

Managerial career
He was appointed as the interim manager for Atlas on January 15, 2018, replacing José Guadalupe Cruz. He was in charge for two matches, losing against Toluca in the league and defeating Tampico Madero in the Copa MX. On January 25, 2018, he returned to his assistant coach position under Rubén Omar Romano. On 19 March 2018, Espinoza was named interim coach for Atlas until the end of the Clausura 2018 tournament following the destitution of Rubén Omar Romano.

Honours

Player
Mexico U23
CONCACAF Olympic Qualifying Championship: 2004

Manager
Tampico Madero
Liga de Expansión MX: Guard1anes 2020

References

External links
 

1981 births
Living people
Footballers from Sinaloa
Association football midfielders
Mexican footballers
Olympic footballers of Mexico
Footballers at the 2004 Summer Olympics
Atlas F.C. footballers
Dorados de Sinaloa footballers
Santos Laguna footballers
Club Universidad Nacional footballers
Atlante F.C. footballers
Chiapas F.C. footballers
Querétaro F.C. footballers
Club Puebla players
Atlas F.C. managers
People from Guamúchil
Mexican football managers
Footballers at the 2003 Pan American Games
Pan American Games bronze medalists for Mexico
Medalists at the 2003 Pan American Games
Pan American Games medalists in football